Muhammad Hassan was the 9th Sultan of Brunei. He reigned from 1582 to 1598. His predecessor Shah Berunai was his older brother who died without an heir. He was succeeded by his eldest son Abdul Jalilul Akbar.

Background
His Highness was the son of Saiful Rijal, the 7th Sultan of Brunei.

Reign

 He introduced the Hukum Kanun Brunei, which is similar to Undang-Undang Melaka.
 He installed another two positions of Viziers, Pengiran Di-Gadong and Pengiran Pemancha.

Descendants

On his coming to Sulu from Brunei around 1609, Raja Bongsu-I also was brought along his royal symbol's called Pulau Janggi (in Sulu) and Sepong  Janggi ( in Brunei). Its 1/3 of a Coco de mer seed fruit. This royal symbol proved that Pangiran Shahbandar Maharajalela @ Raja Bongsu-I belonged to the Brunei Sultanate royal blood. Since then,  this royal symbol was mandated to hold by The Maharajah Adinda family (the Sulu Sultanate 2nd  heir-apparent) and  NOT by the Kiram or the Shakiraullah families (the Sulu Sultanate 1st Heir-apparent).

In 1978, this royal symbol was sent to Brunei Museums for "Safe-Keeping" by the Maharajah Adinda true heir, DATU ALIUDDIN Bin Datu Muhammad Sie ibni Maharajah Adinda Sultan Muhammad Aranan/ Adanan Puyo ibni Raja Muda Datu Bantilan @ Datu Badaruddin ibni Sultan Alimuddin-II ibni Sultan Bantilan Muizuddin ibni Sultan Badaruddin-I ibni Sultan Sultan Salahuddin-Karamat ibni Sultan Mawalil-Wasit-I @ Pangiran Shabandar Maharajalela @ Raja Bongsu-I ibni Sultan Muhammad  Hassan. (Refer to: Brunei Muzeums record).

By the death of Datu Aliuddin Bin Datu Muhammad Sie in 2007, his elder son's Datu Zainal Ali Bin Datu Aliuddin then succeeding the Maharajah Adinda families legacy.

See also
 List of Sultans of Brunei

References

1500s births
1598 deaths
16th-century Sultans of Brunei